In mathematics, more specifically in group theory, the character of a group representation is a function on the group that associates to each group element the trace of the corresponding matrix. The character carries the essential information about the representation in a more condensed form. Georg Frobenius initially developed representation theory of finite groups entirely based on the characters, and without any explicit matrix realization of representations themselves. This is possible because a complex representation of a finite group is determined (up to isomorphism) by its character. The situation with representations over a field of positive characteristic, so-called "modular representations", is more delicate, but Richard Brauer developed a powerful theory of characters in this case as well. Many deep theorems on the structure of finite groups use characters of modular representations.

Applications 
Characters of irreducible representations encode many important properties of a group and can thus be used to study its structure. Character theory is an essential tool in the classification of finite simple groups. Close to half of the proof of the Feit–Thompson theorem involves intricate calculations with character values. Easier, but still essential, results that use character theory include Burnside's theorem (a purely group-theoretic proof of Burnside's theorem has since been found, but that proof came over half a century after Burnside's original proof), and a theorem of Richard Brauer and Michio Suzuki stating that a finite simple group cannot have a generalized quaternion group as its Sylow -subgroup.

Definitions

where  is the trace.

A character  is called irreducible or simple if  is an irreducible representation. A character of degree 1 is called linear. When  is finite and  has characteristic zero, the kernel of the character  is the normal subgroup:

which is precisely the kernel of the representation . However, the character is not a group homomorphism in general.

Properties
 Characters are class functions, that is, they each take a constant value on a given conjugacy class. More precisely, the set of irreducible characters of a given group  into a field  form a basis of the -vector space of all class functions .
 Isomorphic representations have the same characters. Over a field of characteristic , two representations are isomorphic if and only if they have the same character.
 If a representation is the direct sum of subrepresentations, then the corresponding character is the sum of the characters of those subrepresentations.
In particular, when , every such character value is an algebraic integer.

Arithmetic properties
Then the following identities hold:

Character tables

The irreducible complex characters of a finite group form a character table which encodes much useful information about the group  in a compact form. Each entry in the first row is therefore 1. Similarly, it is customary to label the first column by the identity. Therefore, the first column contains the degree of each irreducible character.

Here is the character table of

the cyclic group with three elements and generator u:

where  is a primitive third root of unity.

The character table is always square, because the number of irreducible representations is equal to the number of conjugacy classes.

Orthogonality relations

The space of complex-valued class functions of a finite group  has a natural inner product:

With respect to this inner product, the irreducible characters form an orthonormal basis for the space of class-functions, and this yields the orthogonality relation for the rows of the character table:

The orthogonality relations can aid many computations including:
 Decomposing an unknown character as a linear combination of irreducible characters.
 Constructing the complete character table when only some of the irreducible characters are known.
 Finding the orders of the centralizers of representatives of the conjugacy classes of a group.
 Finding the order of the group.

Character table properties
Certain properties of the group  can be deduced from its character table:

(See Representation theory of finite groups#Applying Schur's lemma.) More generally, the sum of the squares of the absolute values of the entries in any column gives the order of the centralizer of an element of the corresponding conjugacy class.
It follows, using some results of Richard Brauer from modular representation theory, that the prime divisors of the orders of the elements of each conjugacy class of a finite group can be deduced from its character table (an observation of Graham Higman).

The character table does not in general determine the group up to isomorphism: for example, the quaternion group  and the dihedral group of  elements, have the same character table. Brauer asked whether the character table, together with the knowledge of how the powers of elements of its conjugacy classes are distributed, determines a finite group up to isomorphism. In 1964, this was answered in the negative by E. C. Dade.

This gives rise to a group of linear characters, called the character group under the operation . This group is connected to Dirichlet characters and Fourier analysis.

Induced characters and Frobenius reciprocity

The characters discussed in this section are assumed to be complex-valued. Let  be a subgroup of the finite group .

The defining formula of Frobenius reciprocity can be extended to general complex-valued class functions.

This led to an alternative description of the induced character .

The general technique of character induction and later refinements found numerous applications in finite group theory and elsewhere in mathematics, in the hands of mathematicians such as Emil Artin, Richard Brauer, Walter Feit and Michio Suzuki, as well as Frobenius himself.

Mackey decomposition
The Mackey decomposition was defined and explored by George Mackey in the context of Lie groups, but is a powerful tool in the character theory and representation theory of finite groups.

There is a similar formula for the restriction of an induced module to a subgroup, which holds for representations over any ring, and has applications in a wide variety of algebraic and topological contexts.

The formula (with its derivation) is:

(where  is a full set of -double coset representatives, as before).

"Twisted" dimension
One may interpret the character of a representation as the "twisted" dimension of a vector space. Treating the character as a function of the elements of the group , its value at the identity is the dimension of the space, since . Accordingly, one can view the other values of the character as "twisted" dimensions.

One can find analogs or generalizations of statements about dimensions to statements about characters or representations. A sophisticated example of this occurs in the theory of monstrous moonshine: the -invariant is the graded dimension of an infinite-dimensional graded representation of the Monster group, and replacing the dimension with the character gives the McKay–Thompson series for each element of the Monster group.

Characters of Lie groups and Lie algebras

.
.
The character will satisfy  for all  in the associated Lie group  and all . If we have a Lie group representation and an associated Lie algebra representation, the character  of the Lie algebra representation is related to the character  of the group representation by the formula
.

Suppose now that  is a complex semisimple Lie algebra with Cartan subalgebra . The restriction of the character to  can easily be computed in terms of the weight spaces, as follows:
,

See also

 Association schemes, a combinatorial generalization of group-character theory.
 Clifford theory, introduced by A. H. Clifford in 1937, yields information about the restriction of a complex irreducible character of a finite group  to a normal subgroup .
 Frobenius formula
 Real element, a group element g such that χ(g) is a real number for all characters χ

References

 Lecture 2 of     online

External links
 

Representation theory of groups